Nigel Hall may refer to:

 Nigel Hall (rugby union) (born 1978), New Zealand rugby union player
 Nigel Hall (sculptor) (born 1943), English sculptor and draughtsman
 Nigel Hall (musician) (born 1981), American funk keyboardist